The Kyneton Observer was a newspaper based in Kyneton, Victoria, Australia. It began in March 1856 and became defunct on 28 August 1925.

James Thomson was an editor of the paper c. 1870s.

The Kyneton Observer was absorbed by the Kyneton Guardian in 1925.

References

External links
Website for the Kyneton Historical Society which holds past and current issues

1856 establishments in Australia
1925 disestablishments in Australia
Defunct newspapers published in Victoria (Australia)
Kyneton, Victoria
Newspapers on Trove